Oksana Kalashnikova and Yaroslava Shvedova were the defending champions, but chose not to participate this year.

Dominika Cibulková and Kirsten Flipkens won the title, defeating Kiki Bertens and Demi Schuurs in the final, 4–6, 6–4, [10–6].

Seeds

Draw

Draw

References
 Main Draw

Ricoh Openandnbsp;- Doubles
2017 Women's Doubles